In biochemistry, fatty acid synthesis is the creation of fatty acids from acetyl-CoA and NADPH through the action of enzymes called fatty acid synthases. This process takes place in the cytoplasm of the cell. Most of the acetyl-CoA which is converted into fatty acids is derived from carbohydrates via the glycolytic pathway. The glycolytic pathway also provides the glycerol with which three fatty acids can combine (by means of ester bonds) to form triglycerides (also known as "triacylglycerols" – to distinguish them from fatty "acids" – or simply as "fat"), the final product of the lipogenic process. When only two fatty acids combine with glycerol and the third alcohol group is phosphorylated with a group such as phosphatidylcholine, a phospholipid is formed. Phospholipids form the bulk of the lipid bilayers that make up cell membranes and surrounds the organelles within the cells (such as the cell nucleus, mitochondria, endoplasmic reticulum, Golgi apparatus, etc.).

Straight-chain fatty acids
Straight-chain fatty acids occur in two types: saturated and unsaturated.

Saturated straight-chain fatty acids

Much like β-oxidation, straight-chain fatty acid synthesis occurs via the six recurring reactions shown below, until the 16-carbon palmitic acid is produced.

The diagrams presented show how fatty acids are synthesized in microorganisms and list the enzymes found in Escherichia coli. These reactions are performed by fatty acid synthase II (FASII), which in general contain multiple enzymes that act as one complex. FASII is present in prokaryotes, plants, fungi, and parasites, as well as in mitochondria.

In animals, as well as some fungi such as yeast, these same reactions occur on fatty acid synthase I (FASI), a large dimeric protein that has all of the enzymatic activities required to create a fatty acid. FASII is less efficient than FASI; however, it allows for the formation of more molecules, including "medium-chain" fatty acids via early chain termination.

Once a 16:0 carbon fatty acid has been formed, it can undergo a number of modifications, resulting in desaturation and/or elongation. Elongation, starting with stearate (18:0), is performed mainly in the ER by several membrane-bound enzymes. The enzymatic steps involved in the elongation process are principally the same as those carried out by FAS, but the four principal successive steps of the elongation are performed by individual proteins, which may be physically associated.

Note that during fatty synthesis the reducing agent is NADPH, whereas NAD is the oxidizing agent in beta-oxidation (the breakdown of fatty acids to acetyl-CoA). This difference exemplifies a general principle that NADPH is consumed during biosynthetic reactions, whereas NADH is generated in energy-yielding reactions. (Thus NADPH is also required for the synthesis of cholesterol from acetyl-CoA; while NADH is generated during glycolysis.) The source of the NADPH is two-fold. When malate is oxidatively decarboxylated by "NADP+-linked malic enzyme" to form pyruvate,  and NADPH are formed. NADPH is also formed by the pentose phosphate pathway which converts glucose into ribose, which can be used in synthesis of nucleotides and nucleic acids, or it can be catabolized to pyruvate.

Conversion of carbohydrates into fatty acids

In humans, fatty acids are formed from carbohydrates predominantly in the liver and adipose tissue, as well as in the mammary glands during lactation.

The pyruvate produced by glycolysis is an important intermediary in the conversion of carbohydrates into fatty acids and cholesterol. This occurs via the conversion of pyruvate into acetyl-CoA in the mitochondrion. However, this acetyl CoA needs to be transported into cytosol where the synthesis of fatty acids and cholesterol occurs. This cannot occur directly. To obtain cytosolic acetyl-CoA, citrate (produced by the condensation of acetyl CoA with oxaloacetate) is removed from the citric acid cycle and carried across the inner mitochondrial membrane into the cytosol. There it is cleaved by ATP citrate lyase into acetyl-CoA and oxaloacetate. The oxaloacetate can be used for gluconeogenesis (in the liver), or it can be returned into mitochondrion as malate. The cytosolic acetyl-CoA is carboxylated by acetyl CoA carboxylase into malonyl CoA, the first committed step in the synthesis of fatty acids.

Animals cannot resynthesize carbohydrates from fatty acids
The main fuel stored in the bodies of animals is fat. The  or so of glycogen stored in the liver is depleted within one day of starvation. Thereafter the glucose that is released into the blood by the liver for general use by the body tissues, has to be synthesized from the glucogenic amino acids and a few other gluconeogenic substrates, which do not include fatty acids.

Fatty acids are broken down to acetyl-CoA by means of beta oxidation inside the mitochondria, whereas fatty acids are synthesized from acetyl-CoA outside the mitochondrion, in the cytosol. The two pathways are distinct, not only in where they occur, but also in the reactions that occur, and the substrates that are used. The two pathways are mutually inhibitory, preventing the acetyl-CoA produced by beta-oxidation from entering the synthetic pathway via the acetyl-CoA carboxylase reaction. It can also not be converted to pyruvate as the pyruvate decarboxylation reaction is irreversible. Instead it condenses with oxaloacetate, to enter the citric acid cycle. Thus each turn of the citric acid cycle oxidizes an acetyl-CoA unit while regenerating the oxaloacetate molecule with which the acetyl-CoA had originally combined to form citric acid. The decarboxylation reactions occur before malate is formed in the cycle. Malate is the only substance that can be removed from the mitochondrion to enter the gluconeogenic pathway to form glucose or glycogen in the liver or any other tissue. There can therefore be no net conversion of fatty acids into glucose.

Only plants possess the enzymes to convert acetyl-CoA into oxaloacetate from which malate can be formed to ultimately be converted to glucose.

Regulation

Acetyl-CoA is formed into malonyl-CoA by acetyl-CoA carboxylase, at which point malonyl-CoA is destined to feed into the fatty acid synthesis pathway. Acetyl-CoA carboxylase is the point of regulation in saturated straight-chain fatty acid synthesis, and is subject to both phosphorylation and allosteric regulation. Regulation by phosphorylation occurs mostly in mammals, while allosteric regulation occurs in most organisms. Allosteric control occurs as feedback inhibition by palmitoyl-CoA and activation by citrate. When there are high levels of palmitoyl-CoA, the final product of saturated fatty acid synthesis, it allosterically inactivates acetyl-CoA carboxylase to prevent a build-up of fatty acids in cells. Citrate acts to activate acetyl-CoA carboxylase under high levels, because high levels indicate that there is enough acetyl-CoA to feed into the Krebs cycle and conserve energy.

High plasma levels of insulin in the blood plasma (e.g. after meals) cause the dephosphorylation of acetyl-CoA carboxylase, thus promoting the formation of malonyl-CoA from acetyl-CoA, and consequently the conversion of carbohydrates into fatty acids, while epinephrine and glucagon (released into the blood during starvation and exercise) cause the phosphorylation of this enzyme, inhibiting lipogenesis in favor of fatty acid oxidation via beta-oxidation.

Unsaturated straight chain fatty acids

Anaerobic desaturation
Many bacteria use the anaerobic pathway for synthesizing unsaturated fatty acids. This pathway does not utilize oxygen and is dependent on enzymes to insert the double bond before elongation utilizing the normal fatty acid synthesis machinery. In Escherichia coli, this pathway is well understood.

 FabA is a β-hydroxydecanoyl-ACP dehydrase – it is specific for the 10-carbon saturated fatty acid synthesis intermediate (β-hydroxydecanoyl-ACP).
 FabA catalyzes the dehydration of β-hydroxydecanoyl-ACP, causing the release of water and insertion of the double bond between C7 and C8 counting from the methyl end. This creates the trans-2-decenoyl intermediate.
 Either the trans-2-decenoyl intermediate can be shunted to the normal saturated fatty acid synthesis pathway by FabB, where the double bond will be hydrolyzed and the final product will be a saturated fatty acid, or FabA will catalyze the isomerization into the cis-3-decenoyl intermediate.
 FabB is a β-ketoacyl-ACP synthase that elongates and channels intermediates into the mainstream fatty acid synthesis pathway. When FabB reacts with the cis-decenoyl intermediate, the final product after elongation will be an unsaturated fatty acid.
 The two main unsaturated fatty acids made are Palmitoleoyl-ACP (16:1ω7) and cis-vaccenoyl-ACP (18:1ω7).

Most bacteria that undergo anaerobic desaturation contain homologues of FabA and FabB. Clostridia are the main exception; they have a novel enzyme, yet to be identified, that catalyzes the formation of the cis double bond.

Regulation

This pathway undergoes transcriptional regulation by FadR and FabR. FadR is the more extensively studied protein and has been attributed bifunctional characteristics. It acts as an activator of fabA and fabB transcription and as a repressor for the β-oxidation regulon. In contrast, FabR acts as a repressor for the transcription of fabA and fabB.

Aerobic desaturation
Aerobic desaturation is the most widespread pathway for the synthesis of unsaturated fatty acids. It is utilized in all eukaryotes and some prokaryotes. This pathway utilizes desaturases to synthesize unsaturated fatty acids from full-length saturated fatty acid substrates. All desaturases require oxygen and ultimately consume NADH even though desaturation is an oxidative process. Desaturases are specific for the double bond they induce in the substrate. In Bacillus subtilis, the desaturase, Δ5-Des, is specific for inducing a cis-double bond at the Δ5 position. Saccharomyces cerevisiae contains one desaturase, Ole1p, which induces the cis-double bond at Δ9.

In mammals the aerobic desaturation is catalyzed by a complex of three membrane-bound enzymes (NADH-cytochrome b5 reductase, cytochrome b5, and a desaturase). These enzymes allow molecular oxygen, to interact with the saturated fatty acyl-CoA chain, forming a double bond and two molecules of water, . Two electrons come from NADH +  and two from the single bond in the fatty acid chain. These mammalian enzymes are, however, incapable of introducing double bonds at carbon atoms beyond C-9 in the fatty acid chain..) Hence mammals cannot synthesize linoleate or linolenate (which have double bonds at the C-12 (= Δ12), or the C-12 and C-15 (= Δ12 and Δ15) positions, respectively, as well as at the Δ9 position), nor the polyunsaturated, 20-carbon arachidonic acid that is derived from linoleate. These are all termed essential fatty acids, meaning that they are required by the organism, but can only be supplied via the diet. (Arachidonic acid is the precursor the prostaglandins which fulfill a wide variety of functions as local hormones.)

Odd-chain fatty acids
Odd-chain fatty acids (OCFAs) are those fatty acids that contain an odd number of carbon atoms. The most common OCFAs are the saturated C15 and C17 derivatives, respectively pentadecanoic acid and heptadecanoic acid. The synthesis of even-chained fatty acid synthesis is done by assembling acetyl-CoA precursors, however, propionyl-CoA instead of acetyl-CoA is used as the primer for the biosynthesis of long-chain fatty acids with an odd number of carbon atoms.

Regulation

In B. subtilis, this pathway is regulated by a two-component system: DesK and DesR. DesK is a membrane-associated kinase and DesR is a transcriptional regulator of the des gene. The regulation responds to temperature; when there is a drop in temperature, this gene is upregulated. Unsaturated fatty acids increase the fluidity of the membrane and stabilize it under lower temperatures. DesK is the sensor protein that, when there is a decrease in temperature, will autophosphorylate. DesK-P will transfer its phosphoryl group to DesR. Two DesR-P proteins will dimerize and bind to the DNA promoters of the des gene and recruit RNA polymerase to begin transcription.

Pseudomonas aeruginosa

In general, both anaerobic and aerobic unsaturated fatty acid synthesis will not occur within the same system, however Pseudomonas aeruginosa and Vibrio ABE-1 are exceptions.
While P. aeruginosa undergoes primarily anaerobic desaturation, it also undergoes two aerobic pathways. One pathway utilizes a Δ9-desaturase (DesA) that catalyzes a double bond formation in membrane lipids. Another pathway uses two proteins, DesC and DesB, together to act as a Δ9-desaturase, which inserts a double bond into a saturated fatty acid-CoA molecule. This second pathway is regulated by repressor protein DesT. DesT is also a repressor of fabAB expression for anaerobic desaturation when in presence of exogenous unsaturated fatty acids. This functions to coordinate the expression of the two pathways within the organism.

Branched-chain fatty acids
Branched chain fatty acids are usually saturated and are found in two distinct families: the iso-series and anteiso-series. It has been found that Actinomycetales contain unique branch-chain fatty acid synthesis mechanisms, including that which forms tuberculosteric acid.

Branch-chain fatty acid synthesizing system
  

The branched-chain fatty acid synthesizing system uses α-keto acids as primers. This system is distinct from the branched-chain fatty acid synthetase that utilizes short-chain acyl-CoA esters as primers. α-Keto acid primers are derived from the transamination and decarboxylation of valine, leucine, and isoleucine to form 2-methylpropanyl-CoA, 3-methylbutyryl-CoA, and 2-Methylbutyryl-CoA, respectively. 2-Methylpropanyl-CoA primers derived from valine are elongated to produce even-numbered iso-series fatty acids such as 14-methyl-pentadecanoic (isopalmitic) acid, and 3-methylbutyryl-CoA primers from leucine may be used to form odd-numbered iso-series fatty acids such as 13-methyl-tetradecanoic acid. 2-Methylbutyryl-CoA primers from isoleucine are elongated to form anteiso-series fatty acids containing an odd number of carbon atoms such as 12-Methyl tetradecanoic acid. Decarboxylation of the primer precursors occurs through the branched-chain α-keto acid decarboxylase (BCKA) enzyme. Elongation of the fatty acid follows the same biosynthetic pathway in Escherichia coli used to produce straight-chain fatty acids where malonyl-CoA is used as a chain extender. The major end products are 12–17 carbon branched-chain fatty acids and their composition tends to be uniform and characteristic for many bacterial species.

BCKA decarboxylase and relative activities of α-keto acid substrates

The BCKA decarboxylase enzyme is composed of two subunits in a tetrameric structure (A2B2) and is essential for the synthesis of branched-chain fatty acids. It is responsible for the decarboxylation of α-keto acids formed by the transamination of valine, leucine, and isoleucine and produces the primers used for branched-chain fatty acid synthesis. The activity of this enzyme is much higher with branched-chain α-keto acid substrates than with straight-chain substrates, and in Bacillus species its specificity is highest for the isoleucine-derived α-keto-β-methylvaleric acid, followed by α-ketoisocaproate and α-ketoisovalerate. The enzyme's high affinity toward branched-chain α-keto acids allows it to function as the primer donating system for branched-chain fatty acid synthetase.

Factors affecting chain length and pattern distribution

α-Keto acid primers are used to produce branched-chain fatty acids that, in general, are between 12 and 17 carbons in length. The proportions of these branched-chain fatty acids tend to be uniform and consistent among a particular bacterial species but may be altered due to changes in malonyl-CoA concentration, temperature, or heat-stable factors (HSF) present. All of these factors may affect chain length, and HSFs have been demonstrated to alter the specificity of BCKA decarboxylase for a particular α-keto acid substrate, thus shifting the ratio of branched-chain fatty acids produced. An increase in malonyl-CoA concentration has been shown to result in a larger proportion of C17 fatty acids produced, up until the optimal concentration (≈20μM) of malonyl-CoA is reached.  Decreased temperatures also tend to shift the fatty-acid distribution slightly toward C17 fatty-acids in Bacillus species.

Branch-chain fatty acid synthase
This system functions similarly to the branch-chain fatty acid synthesizing system, however it uses short-chain carboxylic acids as primers instead of alpha-keto acids. In general, this method is used by bacteria that do not have the ability to perform the branch-chain fatty acid system using alpha-keto primers. Typical short-chain primers include isovalerate, isobutyrate, and 2-methyl butyrate. In general, the acids needed for these primers are taken up from the environment; this is often seen in ruminal bacteria.

The overall reaction is:

 Isobutyryl-CoA + 6 malonyl-CoA +12 NADPH + 12 → Isopalmitic acid + 6  12 NADP + 5  + 7 CoA

The difference between (straight-chain) fatty acid synthase and branch-chain fatty acid synthase is substrate specificity of the enzyme that catalyzes the reaction of acyl-CoA to acyl-ACP.

Omega-alicyclic fatty acids

Omega-alicyclic fatty acids typically contain an omega-terminal propyl or butyryl cyclic group and are some of the major membrane fatty acids found in several species of bacteria. The fatty acid synthetase used to produce omega-alicyclic fatty acids is also used to produce membrane branched-chain fatty acids. In bacteria with membranes composed mainly of omega-alicyclic fatty acids, the supply of cyclic carboxylic acid-CoA esters is much greater than that of branched-chain primers. The synthesis of cyclic primers is not well understood but it has been suggested that mechanism involves the conversion of sugars to shikimic acid which is then converted to cyclohexylcarboxylic acid-CoA esters that serve as primers for omega-alicyclic fatty acid synthesis

Tuberculostearic acid synthesis

Tuberculostearic acid (D-10-Methylstearic acid) is a saturated fatty acid that is known to be produced by Mycobacterium spp. and two species of Streptomyces.  It is formed from the precursor oleic acid (a monounsaturated fatty acid). After oleic acid is esterified to a phospholipid, S-adenosyl-methionine donates a methyl group to the double bond of oleic acid. This methylation reaction forms the intermediate 10-methylene-octadecanoyal. Successive reduction of the residue, with NADPH as a cofactor, results in 10-methylstearic acid

See also
Essential fatty acid
Fatty acid metabolism
Fatty acid synthase
ThYme (database) (2010)

Footnote

References

External links
 Overview at Rensselaer Polytechnic Institute
 Overview at Indiana State University

Metabolism
Fatty acids
Biosynthesis